Kraesher Mooke Watson (born 13 March 1984) is a Costa Rican professional football player.  He usually plays as left midfielder.  He is well known for his control of the ball on the field and for his participation in the Costa Rican minor leagues.

Club career
Watson first entered the Costa Rican Primera División during the 2001–2002 season with Asociacion Deportiva Limonense, a fairly new and inexperienced team to the league. On the 2002–2003 season he was signed by Saprissa where he played as the major defensive midfielder. He then had a short stint in the Primera División Uruguaya with Club Atlético River Plate but returned to play for Santa Barbara, Saprissa and Santos de Guápiles before joining Brujas He returned to hometown club Limón in 2010.

Mooke was sidelined for 6 months after tearing cruciate ligaments in January 2012 while playing with Saprissa. On October 18, 2012 he was permanently removed from Saprissa due to an alleged indiscipline.

International career
Mooke played in the 2001 FIFA U-17 World Championship held in Trinidad and Tobago.

References

External links
 Official Brujas F.C. Web Site
 Official Tournament Statistics

1984 births
Living people
People from Limón Province
Association football midfielders
Costa Rican footballers
Deportivo Saprissa players
Club Atlético River Plate (Montevideo) players
Santos de Guápiles footballers
Brujas FC players
Costa Rican expatriate footballers
Expatriate footballers in Uruguay